Stan Smith was the defending champion, but lost in the third round this year.

Rod Laver won the title, defeating Arthur Ashe 6–1, 6–4, 3–6, 6–4 in the final.

Seeds

Draw

Final rounds

Top half

Section 1

Section 2

Section 3

Section 4

Bottom half

Section 5

Section 6

Section 7

Section 8

External links
 Main draw

U.S. Pro Indoor
1974 Grand Prix (tennis)